Merrill C. Meigs Field Airport (pronounced , formerly )  was a single-runway airport in Chicago that was in operation from December 1948 until March 2003 on Northerly Island, an artificial peninsula on Lake Michigan. The airport sat adjacent to downtown Chicago, the second-largest business district in North America. Meigs Field airport was opened on December 10, 1948, and, by 1955, had become the busiest single-strip airport in the United States. The airport was a familiar sight on the downtown lakefront. The latest air traffic tower was built in 1952, and the terminal was dedicated in 1961. The airfield was named for Merrill C. Meigs.

Chicago mayor Richard M. Daley forced the closing of Meigs in 2003 by ordering the overnight bulldozing of its runway without notice, in violation of Federal Aviation Administration (FAA) regulations.

History

Construction 

Northerly Island, owned by the Chicago Park District, is the only lakefront structure to be built based on Daniel Burnham's 1909 Plan of Chicago. The Plan of Chicago had no provision for air service. The island was to be populated by trees and grass for the public enjoyment by all. Northerly Island was also the site of the Century of Progress (1933–34) in Chicago. Chicago's first airplane flight took place in 1910 in Grant Park, adjacent to Northerly Island, with an international aeronautical exhibition at the same location in 1911. Then, in 1918, regular air mail service to Grant Park began. However, Grant Park was unsuitable for the city's growing aviation needs.

Burnham died in 1912. By 1916, Edward H. Bennett, co-author of the Plan of Chicago, wrote that a lakefront location would be most suitable for an airport serving the central business district. In 1920, Chicagoans approved a bond referendum to pay for landfill construction of the peninsula, and in 1922 construction began. That same year Mayor William Hale Thompson recommended locating the downtown airport there. A few years later the Chicago South Park Commission voted in agreement. In 1928, the Chicago Association of Commerce, representing the business community, also advocated for the lakefront airport.

The Great Depression put numerous civic plans on hold, including the airport. Construction continued on the peninsula itself, with the 1933 World's Fair occupying the just-completed peninsula. In the 1930s the Chicago City Council and Illinois State Legislature passed resolutions to create the airport, but both the poor economy and World War II intervened.

Operations 

Almost immediately after World War II, in 1946, airport construction began. That same year the Illinois state legislature deeded  of adjacent lake bottom to Chicago for additional landfill, to make the property large enough for a suitable runway. Aviation technology had advanced rapidly during World War II. The airport opened on December 10, 1948, in a grand ceremony.

On June 30, 1950, the airport was officially renamed Merrill C. Meigs Field, named after Merrill C. Meigs, publisher of the Chicago Herald and Examiner and an aviation advocate. Various improvements took place over the years, including the 1952 opening of an air traffic control tower, the 1961 opening of a new terminal building (dedicated by Richard J. Daley), runway lengthening, and the late 1990s charting of two FAA instrument approaches allowing landings in poor weather conditions. By the 1970s Meigs Field became a critical facility for aeromedical transport of patients and transplant organs to downtown hospitals as medical transportation technology modernized. Corporate aircraft also used the airfield including Cessna Citation and Dassault Falcon 10 business jets, and Beechcraft King Air and Grumman Gulfstream I business propjets.

The Main Terminal Building was operated by the Chicago Department of Aviation and contained waiting areas as well as office and counter space. In addition, there were four public helicopter pads at the south end of the runway, near McCormick Place. The north end of the runway was near the Adler Planetarium.

Meigs Field also provided commuter airline service to the public, peaking in the late 1980s as Mayor Richard M. Daley took office. During the mid-1950s, Illini Airlines was operating scheduled passenger service between the airport and Freeport, IL, Madison, WI, Rockford, IL and Sterling, IL with de Havilland Dove and Piper Navajo twin engine prop aircraft. From the 1960s to early 1990s, typical intrastate destinations were Springfield, IL and Carbondale, IL. Small airliners such as Beechcraft Model 99, Beechcraft 1900C, de Havilland Canada DHC-6 Twin Otter and Fairchild Swearingen Metro III turboprops as well as Piper PA-31 Navajo prop aircraft were operated on a scheduled basis into the airport. In 1968, Gopher Airlines was operating nonstop service between the airport and Minneapolis/St. Paul with Beechcraft 99 turboprops. In the mid- and late 1970s Air Illinois operated 44-passenger seat Hawker Siddeley HS 748 turboprops into Meigs. The HS 748 was the largest aircraft to use Meigs on a regular basis for scheduled passenger airline operations. Ozark Air Lines, a large local service airline in the midwest that primarily operated McDonnell Douglas DC-9 jets and Fairchild Hiller FH-227B propjets at the time, served the airport during the early 1970s with DHC-6 Twin Otter turboprops with up to eight round trip nonstop flights a day between Meigs and the Illinois state capital in Springfield. Other commuter air carriers serving Meigs Field in 1975 included Midwest Commuter Airways with nonstop flights to Indianapolis and South Bend, and Skystream Airlines with nonstops to Detroit City Airport with both small airlines operating Beechcraft 99 commuter turboprops.

Scheduled passenger helicopter airline service was also available between Meigs Field and Chicago O'Hare Airport and Chicago Midway Airport at different times over the years. From the late 1950s to late 1960s, Chicago Helicopter Airways operated 12-seat Sikorsky S-58C helicopters with frequent flights to both O'Hare and Midway.

Numerous VIPs used the airport in order to maintain security and also to avoid inconveniencing the Chicago traveling public, including President John F. Kennedy. In a common pattern, Air Force One would land at a larger area airport, and the President would then take the Marine One helicopter to Meigs Field to avoid the complications of a Secret Service escort via Chicago's expressways.

On October 15, 1992, a Boeing 727-100 jetliner donated from United Airlines to the Chicago Museum of Science and Industry made its final landing at Meigs, on its way to be transported to the museum to become an exhibit. This was notable because Meigs'  runway was considerably shorter than other airfields the aircraft normally used. Still, the lightly loaded jet did not require all of the runway. The 727 was then barged off the airport, prepared for exhibit and further barged to the museum.

Starting in the early 1990s, the Chicago-area Tuskegee Airmen, Inc provided free airplane rides every month and aviation education to Chicago youth at Meigs Field. Thousands of children took their first airplane rides there until 2003.

Historical airline service 
The following are the main air carriers that operated scheduled passenger service from Meigs Field to Springfield, IL:

 1970-1983: Air Illinois flew the 44-seat Hawker Siddeley HS 748 turboprop, the largest aircraft regularly scheduled into Meigs.
 1984-1985: Mississippi Valley Airlines
 1984-1991: Britt Airways (In 1986 began dba Continental Express operating code share service for Continental Airlines).
 1988-1995: Trans States Airlines (dba Trans World Express operating code share service for TWA).
 1991-2001: Great Lakes Airlines (In 1992 began dba United Express operating code share service for United Airlines).

Smaller carriers that briefly provided service from Meigs to other cities include:

 Blade Helicopters
 Chicago Helicopter Airways
 Gopher Airlines
 Hub Airlines
 Illini Airlines
 Midwest Commuter Airways
 Ozark Air Lines
 Skystream Airlines

According to the February 1, 1976 edition of the Official Airline Guide (OAG), two airlines were serving Meigs Field at this time: Air Illinois and Skystream Airlines. Air Illinois was operating the 44-seat HS-748 turboprop into the airport at this time with nonstop flights to Springfield, IL and continuing no change of plane service to Alton, IL and Carbondale, IL. Skystream Airlines was operating Beechcraft 99 commuter turboprops on a nonstop and direct flights to Detroit Metro Airport, Indianapolis, IN and South Bend, IN.

The September 15, 1994 edition of the OAG reported that three air carriers were serving Meigs Field with scheduled passenger flights: Great Lakes Aviation operating as United Express on behalf of United Airlines, Trans States Airlines flying as Trans World Express on behalf of Trans World Airlines (TWA) and Blade Helicopters. Great Lakes was operating Beechcraft 1900C turboprops on its nonstop service to Lansing, MI, and Springfield, IL and was also flying one stop direct service to Quincy, IL. Trans States served Springfield, IL nonstop with Swearingen Metro III propjets. Blade Helicopters was operating Eurocopter AS350 "AStar" turbine powered helicopters on a high frequency shuttle schedule with 39 flights every weekday to Chicago O'Hare Airport and 12 flights every weekday to Chicago Midway Airport.

Demolition and closure

In 1994, Mayor Richard M. Daley announced plans to close the airport and build a park in its place. Northerly Island, where the airport was located, was owned by the Chicago Park District, which refused to renew the airport lease in 1996. The city briefly closed the airport from the expiration of the lease in October 1996 through February 1997 when pressure from the state legislature persuaded them to reopen the airport.

On the night of March 30, 2003, Mayor Daley ordered city crews to make the runway unusable by bulldozing large X-shaped gouges into the runway surface in the middle of the night.  The stranded aircraft were later allowed to depart from Meigs'  taxiway.

"To do this any other way would have been needlessly contentious," Mayor Daley claimed at a news conference on March 31. Daley defended his actions by claiming it would save the City of Chicago the effort of further court battles before the airport could close. He claimed that safety concerns required the closure, due to the post-September 11 risk of terrorist-controlled aircraft attacking the downtown waterfront near Meigs Field.

"The signature act of Richard Daley's 22 years in office was the midnight bulldozing of Meigs Field," according to Chicago Tribune columnist Eric Zorn. "He ruined Meigs because he wanted to, because he could," columnist John Kass wrote of Daley in the Chicago Tribune.

While aviation interests and commentators decried the move, supporters of the park believe it is for the city's best interest for the land to be a park. For example, the Lake Michigan Federation (later the Alliance for the Great Lakes) released in February 2001 an urban wilderness plan for the site. Instead of calling it "Northerly Island" a reference to the northernmost landmass of four others that were never built under the 1909 Plan of Chicago, "Sanctuary Point" would allow access for many more people than the fairly exclusive use as an airstrip.

On July 28, 2003, an aircraft flying from Maine to the Experimental Aircraft Association Annual Convention in Oshkosh, Wisconsin, made an emergency landing on the grass next to the demolished Meigs Field runway. Mayor Daley accused the pilot of intentionally landing in order to "embarrass" him, despite the FAA's statement that the pilot "did the correct thing" in landing the plane at Meigs.

Interest groups, led by the Friends of Meigs Field, attempted to use the courts to reopen Meigs Field over the following months, but because the airport was owned by the City of Chicago and had paid back its federal aviation grants, the courts ruled that Chicago was allowed to close the field. The FAA fined the city $33,000 for closing an airport with a charted instrument approach without giving the required 30-day notice. This was the maximum fine the law allowed at the time. In the aftermath, the "Meigs Legacy provision" was passed into law, increasing the maximum fine per day from $1,100 to $10,000. On September 17, 2006, the city dropped all legal appeals and agreed to pay the $33,000 fine as well as repay $1 million in FAA Airport Improvement Program funds that it used to demolish the airfield and build Northerly Island Park.

Northerly Island 

By August 2003, construction crews had finished the demolition of Meigs Field. Northerly Island is now a park that features prairie grasses, strolling paths and a giant pond. In 2005, the 7,500 seat Huntington Bank Pavilion, which hosts music concerts in the summer, opened on the site. The island also has a modest beach named 12th Street Beach.

Other Chicagoans had a different vision for the lakefront area. After the 2003 closure, the Friends of Meigs Field introduced a new plan, "Parks and Planes," which promoted the idea of an aviation museum, small operating runway, and park land on the property. This plan suggested that Chicago could qualify for federal funds earmarked for airport property acquisition to purchase many more acres of parkland in Chicago's neighborhoods and to improve the Chicago Park District's maintenance budget.

In media 
Meigs was the default airport for the Microsoft Flight Simulator series until Microsoft Flight Simulator 2004, though the airport remains operational in Flight Simulator 2004. In Flight Simulator X, it was completely removed from the scenery, up until the Steam Edition of the game added it as downloadable content in 2015. Third party add-ons such as "FTX Merrill C. Meigs Field" or "Aerosoft's US Cities X – Chicago" are available to add Meigs back in, while others close or remove the airport for previous versions of the game. Meigs was absent in the initial version 2020 version of Microsoft Flight Simulator, however, it was added as part of the 40th anniversary update, which released on November 11, 2022.  and third-party add-ons are available to include the airport and others, like Hong Kong's Kai Tak Airport, which have been previously demolished. 

In Need for Speed: ProStreet released by Electronic Arts in 2007, the Meigs field appears named as Chicago Airfield, and the player can drive around and race in a modified festival inspired closed race track built around the airstrip. It is available to race only in Grip, Time Attack, Sector Shootout, Grip Class, Drift, Wheelie Competition, 1/4 Mile Drag and 1/2 Mile Drag races.

In Midtown Madness released by Microsoft in 1999, the player is free to drive around a computer-generated version of the Meigs field, as well as in Driver 2, released in 2000 by Reflections.

Meigs Field was seen in the Season 4 Knight Rider season premiere "Knight of the Juggernaut".

References

External links 

 Chicago Park District Northerly Island
 Historical info, including aerial photos of the bulldozer damage
 Volkan Yuksel's October 28, 2007 dated Panoramic photo from SE of the island

Airports established in 1948
Airports disestablished in 2003
Former buildings and structures in Chicago
Demolished buildings and structures in Chicago
2003 disestablishments in Illinois
Defunct airports in Illinois
Airports in Cook County, Illinois
Richard M. Daley